Tianlin County is a county in the west of Guangxi, China, bordering the provinces of Guizhou to the north and Yunnan to the south. It is under the administration of the prefecture-level city of Baise.

Demographics
Ethnic Yao are distributed mostly in the townships of Lizhou 利周, Lucheng 潞城, Bagui 八桂, Nongwa 弄瓦,  Fuda 福达, and Badu 八渡, while ethnic Yi are found in Changjing Village 常井村 of Ding'an Township 定安镇.

The Miao of Tianlin County call themselves "Mengxia 孟夏", while the Zhuang call themselves Puyue 甫越 (bu33 jui33), the Han call themselves Kebianren 客边人 ('guest people'), and the Yi call themselves Buna 布那.

Yao
The Yao of Tianlin County consist of the following four subgroups.

Landian Yao 蓝靛瑶 (autonym: Qinmen 琴门, meaning 'mountain people' 山人)
Pangu Yao 盘古瑶 (autonym: Yumian 育棉)
Beilou Yao 背篓瑶 (autonym: Bunu 布努)
Mubing Yao 木柄瑶 (autonym: Nuomo 诺莫)

Notable people
Li Jinfang (ethnic Zhuang): linguist at the Minzu University of China

Climate

References

Counties of Guangxi
Counties and cities in Baise